The men's light heavyweight event was part of the boxing programme at the 1924 Summer Olympics. The weight class was the second-heaviest contested, and allowed boxers of up to 175 pounds (79.4 kilograms). The competition was held from Wednesday, July 16, 1924, to Sunday, July 20, 1924. 20 boxers from 14 nations competed.

Results

References

Sources
 official report
 

Light heavyweight